Lebah Football Club Sumbawa (simply known as Lebah FC) is an Indonesian football club based in Sumbawa Besar, Sumbawa Regency, West Nusa Tenggara. They currently compete in the Liga 3 and their homeground is Pragas Stadium.

References

External links
 

Football clubs in Indonesia
Football clubs in West Nusa Tenggara
Association football clubs established in 2020
2020 establishments in Indonesia